Ancistrus verecundus is a species of catfish in the family Loricariidae. It is native to South America, where it occurs in the Madeira River basin in Brazil. The species reaches 5.5 cm (2.2 inches) SL. Its specific epithet, verecundus, derives from Latin and means "modest" or "bashful", referencing the absence or reduced presence of tentacles on the snout of the species.

References 

verecundus
Fish described in 2005